Ahmed Al Saadi may refer to:

Ahmed Al Saadi (footballer) (born 1995), Qatari footballer
Ahmed Mubarak Salah Al-Saadi (born 1988), Omani sprinter